Janat Gul (born 5 December 1991) is an Afghan cricketer. He made his first-class debut for Amo Region in the 2017–18 Ahmad Shah Abdali 4-day Tournament on 1 December 2017. He made his Twenty20 debut on 12 September 2020, for Amo Sharks in the 2020 Shpageeza Cricket League.

References

External links
 

1991 births
Living people
Afghan cricketers
Amo Sharks cricketers
Place of birth missing (living people)